Megachile atlantica is a species of bee in the family Megachilidae. It was described by Raymond Benoist
in 1934.

References

Atlantica
Insects described in 1934